Udine is a station on Line 2 of the Milan Metro. It is located at Piazzale Udine, near Parco Lambro, a large urban park, and Quartiere Feltre, a major residential district of Milan. The station was opened on 27 September 1969 as part of the inaugural section of Line 2, between Cascina Gobba and Caiazzo.

References

External links

Line 2 (Milan Metro) stations
Railway stations opened in 1969
1969 establishments in Italy
Railway stations in Italy opened in the 20th century